Dukhovaya is a rural locality (a village) in Allaksky Selsoviet, Kamensky District, Altai Krai, Russia. The population was 88 as of 2013. There are 3 streets.

Geography 
Dukhovaya is located on the Priobskoye plato, 27 km east of Kamen-na-Obi (the district's administrative centre) by road. Allak is the nearest rural locality.

References 

Rural localities in Kamensky District, Altai Krai